The 2021 Iowa State Cyclones football team represented Iowa State University during the 2021 NCAA Division I FBS football season. The Cyclones played their home games at the Jack Trice Stadium in Ames, Iowa, and competed in the Big 12 Conference. The team was coached by sixth-year head coach Matt Campbell, who received an extension the previous offseason. Iowa State began the season ranked seventh in the AP Poll, the highest preseason ranking ever achieved by the Cyclones.

Previous season

The Cyclones finished the 2020 regular season 9–3 and 8–1 in Big 12 play to finish first in the conference. They appeared in the 2020 Big 12 Championship Game for the first time in program history, where they lost to Oklahoma by six points. Iowa State then went on to compete in the 2021 Fiesta Bowl, where the Cyclones won against Oregon. The team finished the 2020 season ranked 9 in the AP Poll rankings. A number of starters from the 2020 team returned for the Cyclones, including RB Breece Hall, TE Charlie Kolar, QB Brock Purdy and LB Mike Rose.

Coaching staff

Schedule 

Schedule Source:

Game summaries

vs. #21 (FCS) Northern Iowa

vs. #10 Iowa

at UNLV

at Baylor

vs. Kansas

at Kansas State

vs. #8 Oklahoma State

at West Virginia

vs. Texas

at Texas Tech

at No. 13 Oklahoma

vs. TCU

vs. Clemson

Rankings

TV ratings

All totals via Sports Media Watch. Streaming numbers not included. † - Data not available.

References

Iowa State
Iowa State Cyclones football seasons
Iowa State Cyclones football